Jeffrey Bryce (born 28 April 1948) is a British former weightlifter. He competed in the men's featherweight event at the 1980 Summer Olympics.

References

External links
 

1948 births
Living people
British male weightlifters
Olympic weightlifters of Great Britain
Weightlifters at the 1980 Summer Olympics
Place of birth missing (living people)
Commonwealth Games medallists in weightlifting
Weightlifters at the 1978 Commonwealth Games
Weightlifters at the 1986 Commonwealth Games
Commonwealth Games bronze medallists for Wales
20th-century British people
21st-century British people
Medallists at the 1978 Commonwealth Games
Medallists at the 1986 Commonwealth Games